Dalem Bekung, also known as Pamayun, was a king of Bali who is traditionally dated in the second half of the 16th century. He belonged to a dynasty of kings who were descended from Majapahit on Java, and reigned from their palace (puri) in Gelgel.

Intrigues and rebellions

The main source for his reign is the Babad Dalem, a chronicle from the 18th century. He was the son of the successful king Dalem Baturenggong, and came to the throne when still a minor. His uncle Dewa Anggungan wished to usurp kingship, and was supported by the nobleman Batan Jeruk who took Dalem Bekung and his brother Seganing into custody. He was immediately opposed by the majority of the grandees of the kingdom and the two infant princes were rescued. Batan Jeruk fled and was killed by loyalist soldiers. His kinsmen later founded the Karangasem kingdom in East Bali. 

Dewa Anggungan was spared but lost his caste status as Ksatria. The Batan Jeruk rebellion is dated in 1556 or 1558 in Balinese texts. When old enough to reign in his own name, Dalem Bekung proved to be an inactive and cowardly ruler, which led to a loss of royal prestige and discipline among the grandees. He left the affairs of state to his chief minister Nginte. In this period the famous Brahmin sage Nirartha, who had entertained a profound impact on the religious elite culture on Bali, died. 

A conflict between the noblemen Kiyayi Pande and Gusti Talabah escalated into a full-scale rebellion where Kiyayi Pande mounted a desperate attack on the troops of the king. In the end he was defeated and killed with utmost effort, an event dated in 1578 by various texts. After this event Dalem Bekung had to leave the Gelgel palace. Late versions of the Babad Dalem assert that his brother Dalem Seganing took over as king in his stead at this point.

Defeat by the Javanese

Towards the end of Dalem Bekung's life, a military expedition was organized to support the East Javanese kingdom of Blambangan against Pasuruan, a port and kingdom on the north coast of Java. The expedition, which was led by the nobleman Jelantik, sailed to Panarukan in East Java, and marched into the land of Pasuruan. However, it met with a shattering defeat and Jelantik was killed. Some time after this calamity, Dalem Bekung died. His name is in fact a nickname, meaning 'the childless'. His brother Dalem Seganing either took the throne or continued to reign.

When the first Dutch expedition, under Cornelis de Houtman, visited Bali in 1597, they met a king who might have been either Dalem Bekung or Dalem Seganing. The king was described as a heavily built, stout man of about 40–50 years. The Dutchmen provided lively accounts of the royal splendours they saw on Bali, which accord rather well with the descriptions in the later Balinese chronicles. At the time of their visit, a large Balinese expedition was prepared in order to assist the still Hindu kingdom of Blambangan against the Muslim Pasuruan. A later Dutch account indicates that the expedition was fruitless, since Blambangan fell to Pasuruan in c. 1597. It has been argued that this must be the Jelantik expedition mentioned in the Babad Dalem. Another hypothesis places Dalem Bekung's reign much later, in the 1630s.

See also 

 History of Bali
 List of monarchs of Bali
 Gelgel, Indonesia

References 

Monarchs of Bali
History of Bali
Balinese people
16th-century Indonesian people